Argentieri is an Italian surname. Notable people with the surname include:

Federigo Argentieri (born 1953), Italian historian
 (1927–2017), Italian film critic and cinema historian

Italian-language surnames